Asia-Pacific Fistball Championships are an international fistball competition run in conjunction with the  International Fistball Association (IFA), and the Asia-Pacific Fistball Association (APFC) with the first men's championships held in Pakistan in 2014. While originally known as the Asian Fistball Championships, the tournament has been renamed to the Asia-Pacific Fistball Championships for subsequent iterations, to recognise the inclusion of Oceanic region fistball associations such as Australia and New Zealand. The participating countries in the first Asia-Pacific Fistball Championships were Pakistan, India, Australia and Nepal.

Asia-Pacific Fistball Championships - Men

Asia-Pacific Fistball Championships - Women

External links
International Fistball Association

References

Asian Championship
Fistball_Championships
Recurring sporting events established in 2014